Prionolepis is a genus of prehistoric ray-finned fish belonging to the order Alepisauriformes.

Fossil record
These ray-finned fish lived in the Upper Cretaceous (Cenomanian - Turonian, about 95-90 million years ago). Fossils have been found in Lebanon and England.

Description
Body was long and tapered, but rather strong and robust, with a series of high serrate scales (hence the name Prionolepis, from the Greek "saw scale"). His muzzle was pointed and very elongated, and jaw was slightly prognathous.

Species
Species within this genus include:
 †Prionolepis angustus Egerton 1850
 †Prionolepis cataphractus (Pictet and Humbert, 1866)
 †Prionolepis laniatus Davis 1887

Bibliography
 Dixon, F., 1850, The Geology and Fossils of the Tertiary and Cretaceous Formations of Sussex, p. 360-377.
 Gallo, V., H. M. A. d. Silva, & F. J. d. Figueiredo. 2005. The interrelationships of †Dercetidae (Neoteleostei, Aulopifromes). pp. 101–104. IN: Poyato-Ariza, F. J. (ed.) Extended Abstracts. Fourth International Meeting on Mesozoic Fishes - Systematics, Homology, and Nomenclature. Ediciones Universidad Autónoma de Madrid, Miraflores de la Sierra, Madrid, Spain August 8–14, 2005, 310 pp.
 Goody, P. C. 1969. The relationships of certain Upper Cretaceous teleosts with special reference to the myctophoids. 7:1-255. Age: Cretaceous-Cretaceous Late; Cretaceous-Cretaceous Late-Senonian; Cretaceous-Cretaceous Late-Turonian; Cretaceous-Cretaceous Late-Cenomanian middle;.
 Hay, O. P. 1903. On a collection of Upper Cretaceous fishes from Mount Lebanon, Syria, with descriptions of four new genera and nineteen new species. American Museum of Natural History, Bulletin 19:395-452.
 Hilda M. A. Silva; Valéria Gallo: Taxonomic review and phylogenetic analysis of Enchodontoidei (Teleostei: Aulopiformes). Anais da Academia Brasileira de Ciências  
 Joseph S. Nelson: Fishes of the World. John Wiley & Sons, 2006,  
 Karl Albert Frickhinger: Fossilien Atlas Fische, Mergus-Verlag, Melle, 1999, 
 Larson, P. L. 1988. Famous fossil fish faunas. Mid-America Paleontology Society Digest 11:1-10.
 Peter L. Forey, Lu Yi, Colin Patterson and Cliff E. Davies, 2003. Fossil fishes from the Cenomanian (Upper Cretaceous) of Namoura, Lebanon. Journal of Systematic Palaeontology (2003), 1:4:227-330 Cambridge University Press The Natural History Museum

References

Prehistoric aulopiformes
Prehistoric ray-finned fish genera
Cretaceous bony fish
Prehistoric fish of Africa